may refer to:
Nakanoshima, a sandbank in central Osaka, Japan
Nakanoshima Park on the sandbank
Nakanoshima (Kagoshima), a volcanic island in the Tokara Islands of Kagoshima Prefecture, Japan
Nakanoshima (Shimane), an island in the Oki Islands of Shimane Prefecture, Japan
Nakanoshima, Niigata, Japan, a former town
A district in Tama-ku, Kawasaki

See also
Nakanoshima Station (disambiguation)